George Robert Heflin (February 22, 1923 – October 23, 1999) was an American football player and coach. Heflin was the 17th head football coach at The Apprentice School in Newport News, Virginia and he held that position for two seasons, from 1960 until 1961. His coaching record at Apprentice was 4–10. He died after a long illness in 1999.

References

1923 births
1999 deaths
The Apprentice Builders football coaches
William & Mary Tribe football players